The list below includes links to articles with further details for each decade, century, and millennium from 11,000BC to 3000AD.

Notes

See also
 List of years
 Timelines of world history
 List of timelines
 Chronology
 See calendar and list of calendars for other groupings of years.
 See history, history by period, and periodization for different organizations of historical events.
 For earlier time periods, see Timeline of the Big Bang, Geologic time scale, Timeline of evolution, and Logarithmic timeline.

Decades
Historical timelines